Tairyūji or Tairyū-ji (Tairyū Temple, Great Dragon Temple) (Japanese: 太龍寺) is a Koyasan Shingon temple in Anan city, Tokushima Prefecture, Japan. Temple # 21 on the Shikoku 88 temple pilgrimage. The main image is of Ākāśagarbha Bodhisattva.

History
The temple was constructed during Emperor Kanmu's era.
In the Tenshō (天正, 1573-1592) era, the temple was destroyed by Chōsokabe Motochika (長宗我部 元親) force.
In the Edo era, the temple was rebuilt with the support of Hachisuka clan (蜂須賀氏).
 Typhoon No. 6 in July 2011 caused a 400-year-old cedar tree to break and broke through the main hall roof.

Cultural properties
Following structures in the temple were designated as Tangible Cultural Properties of Japan on June 21, 2013:
Main Hall: built in 1852
Kōbō-Daishi Hall: built in 1877
Hexagon Sutra Hall: built in 1856
Treasure Stupa: built in 1861
Entrance Gate: built 1806
Bell Tower Gate: built in 1903

See also
 Shikoku 88 temple pilgrimage

References

 四国八十八箇所霊場会 編 『先達教典』 2006年
 宮崎建樹 著 『四国遍路ひとり歩き同行二人』地図編 へんろみち保存協力会 2007年（第8版）

External links
 第21番札所 舎心山 常住院 太龍寺（四国八十八ヶ所霊場会公式）
 Tairyūji Ropeway
 Tokushima Prefecture tourist site

Shingon Buddhism
Buddhist temples in Tokushima Prefecture
Kōyasan Shingon temples